Rose Elizabeth Squire, OBE (1861–1938) was an English factory inspector at the Home Office.

Life
Rose Squire was born in London, the daughter of William Squire, a Harley Street surgeon, and his wife Martha Wilkinson. After home education, she needed to earn a livelihood aged 32 and gained a Diploma from the National Health Society in 1893. She was the first woman to gain a Sanitory Inspector's Certificate in 1894. In 1895 she became a lady inspector of factories, and was appointed senior lady inspector in 1903. In 1906-7 she was a special investigator to the Royal Commission on the Poor Laws. From 1908 to 1912 she was based in Manchester, a city she enjoyed: "Nothing could exceed the friendliness my sister and I experienced in that atmospherically gloomy but socially bright and attractive city." Returning to London in 1912, she worked as a member of the Health of Munitions Workers Committee in the First World War, and was appointed director of the women's welfare department of the Ministry of Munitions in 1918. In 1920 she became the first woman to hold an administrative post in the Home Office. She retired in 1926, receiving a message of congratulation from Queen Mary.

She died at Fryerning, Essex.

Works
 (with A. D. Steel-Maitland) Report on the relation of industrial and sanitary conditions to pauperism, together with an additional memorandum on certain other points connected with the poor law system and its administration. London, Printed for H.M. Stationery Off. by Wyman and Sons, 1909.
 (with Edgar Leigh Collis and W. Sydney Smith) Report upon the conditions under which bronzing is carried on in factories and workshops, London: Printed for H.M. Stationery Off., by Darling & Son, 1910.
 Thirty years in the public service: an industrial retrospect, London : Nisbet & Co., 1927

References

1861 births
1938 deaths
Factory inspectors
Civil servants from London
19th-century English women
19th-century English people
20th-century English women
20th-century English people